André dos Santos Oliveira or simply Rancharia (born February 26, 1983), is a Brazilian soccer player who plays as a central defender for Uberlândia Esporte Clube.

Honours
São Paulo State League: 2004
Minas Gerais State League: 2007

Contract
2 January 2008 to 12 December 2009

External links 
 CBF
 Guardian Stats Centre
 zerozero.pt

1983 births
Living people
Brazilian footballers
Associação Desportiva São Caetano players
Esporte Clube Democrata players
Clube Atlético Mineiro players
Brasiliense Futebol Clube players
Association football defenders